Verrall Newman (21 January 1897 – 7 October 1987) was a British diver. She competed in the women's 10 metre platform event at the 1924 Summer Olympics.

In March 2022 a variety of her sporting medals, still in the possession of her family, were shown on the BBC Television programme Antiques Roadshow.

References

External links
 

1897 births
1987 deaths
British female divers
Olympic divers of Great Britain
Divers at the 1924 Summer Olympics
People from Hampstead